Flight 405 may refer to:

 Mohawk Airlines Flight 405 (1972), crashed on final approach to Albany International Airport, killing 17
 Finnair Flight 405 (1978), hijacked, all survived
Indian Airlines Flight 405, hijacked, all survived
 USAir Flight 405 (1992), crashed shortly after liftoff from New York City LaGuardia airport, killing 27
 Dynamic Airways Flight 405 (2015), caught fire but all survived

0405